The twenty-fifth season of Saturday Night Live, an American sketch comedy series, originally aired in the United States on NBC between October 2, 1999 and May 20, 2000.

Cast
The entire cast from last season returned for another year. Jimmy Fallon, Chris Parnell and Horatio Sanz were all promoted to repertory status, with the cast otherwise unchanged at the start of the season. As the season progressed, the show added two new cast members. Rachel Dratch, recruited from Chicago's The Second City, where she was head writer Tina Fey's comedy partner, joined the show in the episode hosted by former cast member Norm Macdonald. Towards the end of the season, Maya Rudolph of The Groundlings joined the show, starting with the episode hosted by John Goodman. 

This would be the final season for longtime cast members Tim Meadows, Cheri Oteri and Colin Quinn. Oteri and Quinn both left the show on their own terms. Meadows's tenure at Saturday Night Live lasted 10 seasons, having joined the cast in 1991 (at the time of his departure, he was the longest-tenured performer on the show). He decided to leave the show after the season for other acting opportunities.

Cast roster

Repertory players
Jimmy Fallon
Will Ferrell
Ana Gasteyer
Darrell Hammond
Chris Kattan
Tim Meadows
Tracy Morgan
Cheri Oteri
Chris Parnell
Colin Quinn
Horatio Sanz
Molly Shannon

Featured players
Rachel Dratch (first episode: October 23, 1999)
Maya Rudolph (first episode: May 6, 2000)

bold denotes Weekend Update anchor

Contract for new cast members

In July 1999, when executive producer Lorne Michaels held auditions for the season, NBC introduced a new contract for first-year cast members, replacing the five- or six-year deals they had used in the past. The terms were established by NBC executives Scott Sassa and Garth Ancier. According to Peter Bogdanovich, the new contract came with the following terms:
NBC can take a Saturday Night Live cast member off the show any time after their second year on the program and put them in an NBC sitcom.
A cast member has the option of saying no to the first two shows proposed by NBC, but must accept the third deal. 
NBC dictates the length of the sitcom contract, which can run as long as six years.
SNL Films, co-owned by Paramount Pictures, NBC and Lorne Michaels, has a three-movie option that would pay the star a set $75,000 for the first film, $150,000 for the second and $300,000 for the third, rates that used to be negotiable.
NBC has the option of paying those same amounts to force a cast member to say no to a film deal offered to them by another studio.
The starting salary remained $5,000 per episode.

Writers

Starting this season Tina Fey is credited as the writing supervisor.

Episodes

Specials

Superstar film

A Superstar film, based on the Mary Katherine Gallagher sketches, was released on October 8, 1999. Cast members Will Ferrell, Mark McKinney and Molly Shannon appear in the film. The film did modestly well at the box office but was panned by critics.

References

25
Saturday Night Live in the 1990s
Saturday Night Live in the 2000s
1999 American television seasons
2000 American television seasons
Television shows directed by Beth McCarthy-Miller